Jean Strubbe (29 December 1887 – 13 December 1936) was a Belgian footballer. He played in one match for the Belgium national football team in 1911.

References

External links
 

1887 births
1936 deaths
Belgian footballers
Belgium international footballers
Place of birth missing
Association football defenders